The 1999–2000 season was Real Madrid C.F.'s 69th season in La Liga. This article lists all matches that the club played in the 1999–2000 season, and also shows statistics of the club's players.

Summary
John Toshack was sacked by Real in November as a consequence of league's bad form following a 3–2 defeat against Rayo Vallecano that left them in eighth position and re-hired Vicente del Bosque who previously managed Real Madrid in 1994 and 1996 as a caretaker only.

This was the season that marked the start of the Vicente del Bosque era of trophy winning at the club, having taken over from John Toshack early in the campaign. The squad was also largely different from the previous squad, with the arrival of Steve McManaman (Liverpool) and Nicolas Anelka (Arsenal) from the English Premier League respectively, as well as local talents Míchel Salgado, and Iván Helguera, to support the budding young talent of Raúl, Iker Casillas, Fernando Morientes and Guti, as well as the older veterans such as Fernando Hierro and Roberto Carlos.

Players

Squad

Transfers

In

Total spending:  €95,700,000

Out

 
Total income:    €0  million

Competitions

Overall

Friendlies

La Liga

Results summary

League table

Results by round

Matches

Copa del Rey

Champions League

First Group stage

Second Group stage

Knockout stage

Final

FIFA Club World Championship

Group stage

Third-place play-off

Squad statistics

Players statistics

Goal scorers

See also
1999–2000 La Liga
1999–2000 Copa del Rey
1999–2000 UEFA Champions League
2000 UEFA Champions League Final
2000 FIFA Club World Championship

References

External links
Realmadrid.com Official Site
Real Madrid Team Page 
 Real Madrid (Spain) profile
uefa.com - UEFA Champions League
Web Oficial de la Liga de Fútbol Profesional
FIFA

Spanish football clubs 1999–2000 season
1999–2000
1999–2000